The 1961–62 Liga Alef season saw Hakoah Tel Aviv win the title and promotion to Liga Leumit.

Final table

References
Hakoah officially crowned champion of Liga Alef Heruth, 29.4.62, Historical Jewish Press 
Previous seasons The Israel Football Association 

Liga Alef seasons
Israel
2